Aavo Sirk (born in 1945) is an Estonian physicist.

He has worked at National Institute of Chemical Physics and Biophysics 

He gave his signature to Letter of 40 intellectuals. 

In 2006, he was awarded with Order of the National Coat of Arms, IV class.

References

Living people
1945 births
20th-century Estonian physicists
21st-century Estonian physicists